Promenade Mall or The Promenade may refer to:

Canada 
 Promenade (shopping centre), in Thornhill, Ontario
 Promenades Saint-Bruno, Saint-Bruno, Quebec

India
 DLF Promenade, in Delhi

United States 
 The Promenade at Coconut Creek, in Coconut Creek, Florida
 Promenade Temecula, in Temecula, California
 The Promenade at Sagemore, in Evesham Township, New Jersey
 The Promenade at Howard Hughes Center, in Los Angeles, California
 Third Street Promenade, in Santa Monica, California
 Tulsa Promenade, in Tulsa, Oklahoma
 The Promenade Shops at Saucon Valley, in Center Valley, Pennsylvania
 The Promenade at Chenal, in Little Rock, Arkansas
 The Promenade (California), a dead shopping mall in Woodland Hills, Los Angeles, California
 Pinnacle Hills Promenade, in Rogers, Arkansas
 Promenade on the Peninsula, in Rolling Hills Estates, South Bay area of Greater Los Angeles
 Promenade at Granite Run, in Middletown Township, Delaware County, Pennsylvania

See also
Promenade (disambiguation)